Thomas Cyril "Cy" Kasper (May 27, 1895 – December 28, 1991) was an American football player and coach. He served as the head football coach at Alfred University in Alfred, New York from 1923 to 1924 and South Dakota State University from 1928 to 1933.

Kasper played college football at the University of Notre Dame from 1919 to 1920 under head coach Knute Rockne. He originally played inter-hall football until being recommended to play varsity football by other football players. Rockne pushed Kasper to take the 1927 head coaching position at the University of Wyoming, but he headed to South Dakota State instead.

Kasper was born on May 27, 1895, in Faribault, Minnesota, where he attended Shattuck Preparatory School. He died on December 28, 1991, in Bismarck, North Dakota.

Head coaching record

College

References

External links
 
 

1895 births
1991 deaths
University of Notre Dame alumni
American football fullbacks
American football halfbacks
Notre Dame Fighting Irish football players
Rochester Jeffersons players
Alfred Saxons football coaches
South Dakota State Jackrabbits football coaches
South Dakota State Jackrabbits athletic directors
High school football coaches in Minnesota
People from Faribault, Minnesota
Coaches of American football from Minnesota
Players of American football from Minnesota